The Tlaxcala-Puebla Nahuatl language, also known as Central Nahuatl, is a Nahuan language spoken by 40,000 people in central Mexico.

Name
It is variously known as Central Aztec, Náhuatl del Centro, and Puebla-Tlaxcala Nahuatl. In 1990, there were 1,000 Tlaxcala-Puebla Nahuatl monolinguals.

References

Nahuatl, Central Puebla
Nahuatl